The minister of national revenue is the minister of the Crown in the Canadian Cabinet who is responsible for the Canada Revenue Agency (CRA), as well as the administration of taxation law and collection. 

The current minister of national revenue is Diane Lebouthillier, who took office on November 4, 2015, following the 2015 federal election.

History
The responsibility for collecting taxes was first assigned to the minister of inland revenue, formed in 1867. Between 1892 and 1897, during the 7th Canadian Parliament, the portfolio was considered to be only of the ministry, but not the Cabinet, and was thus referred to as the controller of inland revenue during that time. The minister of inland revenue title returned after 1897 and remained until the office was formally abolished.

In 1918, the offices of the minister of inland revenue and the minister of customs were combined into a new position, the minister of customs and inland revenue. In 1921, the minister of customs and inland revenue was replaced by the minister of customs and excise by Statute 11-12 Geo. V, c. 26, which assented to on 4 June 1921. 

On March 31, 1927, when the position of minister of customs and excise was abolished and replaced by the present day minister of national revenue. The new National Revenue department was established by expanding the former Department of Customs and Excise with a new facility for the collection of income tax, which had formerly been the responsibility of the Department of Finance. The department became known as Revenue Canada during the 1970s, and subsequently became the Canada Customs and Revenue Agency (CCRA) in 1999. In 2003, the CCRA was split into the Canada Revenue Agency and the Canada Border Services Agency (CBSA), the latter falling under the public safety and emergency preparedness portfolio.

List of ministers
Key:

Predecessors

Minister of Inland Revenue

Minister of Customs and Inland Revenue

See also 

 Taxation in Canada
 Government revenue
 Revenue service

References

External links
 Canada Revenue Agency

National Revenue